The Miss Louisiana competition is the pageant that selects the representative for the state of Louisiana in the Miss America pageant. Although no delegate from Louisiana has ever won the Miss America title, four have placed 1st runner-up. As of 2022, Louisiana is the lone member of the Confederacy during the Civil War which has not produced a Miss America.

The pageant is held the last week of June at the W. L. Jack Howard Theatre, named for the late Mayor W. L. "Jack" Howard and located in downtown Monroe adjacent to the Civic Center. The 2018 pageant was the fifty-fifth to have been held in Monroe.

Gracie Reichman of Colfax was crowned Miss Louisiana 2022 on June 18, 2022, at Jack Howard Theatre in Monroe. She competed for the title Miss America 2023 in December 2022, at Mohegan Sun in Uncasville, Connecticut where she won a Non-finalist Talent award.

Results summary
The following is a visual summary of the past results of Miss Louisiana titleholders at the national Miss America pageants/competitions. The year in parentheses indicates the year of the national competition during which a placement and/or award was garnered, not the year attached to the contestant's state title.

Placements 
 1st runners-up: Patricia Brant (1988), Erika Schwarz (1997), Faith Jenkins (2001), Jennifer Dupont (2005) 
 2nd runners-up: Holli' Conway (2019)
 3rd runners-up: Marguerite McClelland (1946), Debbie Ward (1974), Katherine Putnam (2010), April Nelson (2016)
 4th runners-up: Libby Lovejoy (1975), Linnea Fayard (1991)
 Top 7: Laryssa Bonacquisti (2018)
 Top 10: Barbara Barker (1953), Lynda Ferguson (1966), Genevieve Del Gallo (1968), Debby Robert (1973), Phyllis Kelly (1979), Valerie Brosset (1989), Christi Page (1992), Mette Boving (1998), Hope Anderson (2012)
 Top 15: Louise Moore (1924), Justine Ker (2017)
 Top 16: Gertrude Rissie Miller (1937)
 Top 18: Marjorie Hagler (1933)

Awards

Preliminary awards
 Preliminary Lifestyle and Fitness: Valerie Brosset (1989), Stacy King (1990), Christi Page (1992), Faith Jenkins (2001), Jennifer Dupont (2005), Laryssa Bonacquisti (2018)
 Preliminary Talent: Debby Robert (1973), Debbie Ward (1974), Patricia Brant (1988), Julie Lawrence (2000), Faith Jenkins (2001), April Nelson (2016), Laryssa Bonacquisti (2018), Holli' Conway (2019)

Non-finalist awards
 Non-finalist Talent: Bobbie Chachere (1957), Cherie Martin (1965), Myrrah McCully (1980), Bobbie Candler (1983), Miriam Gauthier (1984), Amanda Mainord (1987), Stacy King (1990), Karmyn Tyler (1996), Julie Lawrence (2000), Jaden Leach (2014), Meagan Crews (2020), Gracie Reichman (2023)
 Non-finalist Interview: Lacey Sanchez (2015)

Other awards
 Miss Congeniality: N/A
 Miss America Scholar Award: Julie Lawrence (2000)
 Children's Miracle Network (CMN) Miracle Maker Award: Katherine Putnam (2010), Hope Anderson (2012)
 CMN Miracle Maker Award 2nd runners-up: Lacey Sanchez (2015)
 Quality of Life Award Winners: Faith Jenkins (2001)
 Quality of Life Award 1st runners-up: Heather Dupree (1999)
 Quality of Life Award 2nd runners-up: Erika Schwarz (1997)
STEM Scholarship 1st runner-up: Julia Claire Williams (2022)

Winners

References

External links
 Miss Louisiana official website
 Exclusive Interview with Miss Louisiana 2012

Louisiana culture
Louisiana
Women in Louisiana
1922 establishments in Louisiana
Recurring events established in 1922
Annual events in Louisiana